This is a list of people associated with Istanbul Technical University in Turkey.

Politicians and public figures 

 Ahmet Arslan (born 1962) -  Minister of Transport, Maritime and Communication and a Member of Parliament for Kars 
 Fatih Birol (born 1958) -  Executive Director of the International Energy Agency (2015–present), Chief Economist of the International Energy Agency (1995-2015)
 Bedrettin Dalan (born 1941) - former Mayor of Istanbul (1984–1989)
 Vedat Ali Dalokay (1927–1991) - former Mayor of Ankara (1973–1977)
 Süleyman Demirel (1924-2015) - former President of Turkey (1993–2000) and Prime minister (five times between 1965–1993)
 Aytaç Durak (1938-2014) - Mayor of Adana (1994–2014)
 Necmettin Erbakan (1926-2011) - former Prime minister (1996–1997) and former President of TOBB (1969)
 Veysel Eroğlu (born 1948) - Minister of Environment and former Head of State Hydraulic Works
 Safa Giray (1931-2011) - former Minister of Foreign Affairs (1991)
 Recai Kutan (born 1930) - President of Felicity Party
 Turgut Özal (1927–1993) - former President of Turkey (1989–1993) and prime minister (1983–1989)
 Ruhsar Pekcan (born 1958) - Minister of Trade (2018-Present)
 Binali Yıldırım (born 1955) - Prime Minister, maritime engineer and former  Minister of Transport, Maritime and Communication
 Taner Yildiz  (born 1962) - Minister of Energy and Natural Resources (2009-2015)
 İsmet Yılmaz (born 1961) - Minister of National Education of Turkey and former Speaker of the Grand National Assembly

Business 
 İshak Alaton (born 1927) - co-founder of Alarko Holding
 Halil Boztepe (born 1970) - CEO of Tepe Kimya
 Üzeyir Garih (1929–2001) - co-founder of Alarko Holding
 Sadi Gülçelik (born 1929) - co-founder of ENKA Holding
 Mehmet Hacim Kamoy (1922-2004) - founding CEO of ASELSAN
 Temel Kotil (born 1959) - CEO of Turkish Airlines
 Volkan Sevilgen (born 1980) - CTO and co-founder of Temblor, Inc.
 Şarık Tara (born 1930) - co-founder of ENKA Holding
 Faruk Yarman (born 1954) - CEO of HAVELSAN

Science and technology 
 Celâl Şengör (born 1955) - geologist
 Zeynep Ahunbay (born 1946) - architect
 Ali Akansu (born 1958) - electrical & computer engineering and scientist, professor at NJIT
 Attila Aşkar (born 1944) - civil engineer and applied mathematician, president and provost (rector) of the Koç University. (2001 - 2009)
 Ivet Bahar - computational biologist, professor at University of Pittsburgh
 Ali Erdemir - material scientist
 A. Cemal Eringen (born February 15, 1921 in Kayseri, Turkey - died December 7, 2009) - civil engineer and applied mathematician; professor of continuum physics in the departments of civil engineering and geological engineering, the founder of the program in computational and applied mathematics at Princeton University. Eringen Medal is given every year to a most successful scientist in the fields of continuum mechanics, elasticity, plasticity, rheology and materials science in his honor.
 Doğan Kuban (born 1926) - architectural historian
 Emin Halid Onat (1908–1961) - architect of Anıtkabir and first dean of ITU School of Architecture
Hürriyet Sırmaçek (1912 - 1983) Turkey's first female bridge engineer.
 Mehmet Toner (born 1958) -  biomedical engineering scientist, professor at MIT
 Karl von Terzaghi (1883–1963) - mechanical engineer, founder of soil mechanics

Art 
 Funda Arar (born 1975) - pop singer
 Ahmet Aslan (born 1968) - musician
 Oğuz Atay (1934–1977) - novelist
 Murat Boz - pop singer
 Güler Duman (born 1967) - Turkish folk music
 Berke Hatipoğlu (born 1976) - architect, guitarist of the rock band Redd
 Erkan Oğur (born 1954) - musician
 Ziynet Sali - singer
 Ahmet Yalçınkaya (born 1963) - poet

Sports 

 Zehra Öktem - Olympic archer
 Çağla Kubat - windsurfer

Political activists 
 Harun Karadeniz (1942–1975) - 1970s student leader

Others 
 Behruz Çinici - architect of METU Ankara Campus
 Mehmet Gümüşburun - bureaucrat
 Sabiha Gürayman - first Turkish woman engineer
 Waleed A. Samkari - Commander of Royal Maintenance Corps (Jordan)

Dropouts 

 Yılmaz Erdoğan (born 1967) - actor
 Orhan Pamuk (born 1952) - novelist, Nobel Laureate in Literature (2006)

References 

Istanbul Technical University
Istanbul Technical University
 
 
People
Istanbul technical University